In music, Op. 92 stands for Opus number 92. Compositions that are assigned this number include:

 Beethoven – Symphony No. 7
 Britten – A Birthday Hansel
 Dvořák – Carnival Overture
 Mendelssohn – Allegro Brillant
 Prokofiev – String Quartet No. 2
 Schumann – Introduction and Allegro appassionato
 Shostakovich – String Quartet No. 5
 Sibelius – Oma maa